Navbahor is an urban-type settlement in Fergana Region, Uzbekistan. It is the administrative center of Furqat District. Its population is 4,500 (2016).

References

Populated places in Fergana Region
Urban-type settlements in Uzbekistan